Mount Washington Transit Tunnel is an important public transportation link in Pittsburgh, Pennsylvania, United States.  The  tunnel connects Station Square to South Hills Junction, and is used only by Pittsburgh Light Rail cars and buses of the Port Authority of Allegheny County. The tunnel changes 204.54 feet in elevation from its north portal at 750.36 feet above sea level to its south portal at 954.90 feet above sea level, resulting in a grade of 5.86%. With the cessation of bus service in the Downtown Seattle Transit Tunnel in 2019, the Mount Washington Transit Tunnel is the only tunnel in the United States shared by bus and rail services.

History

The tunnel was built by Booth and Flinn for Pittsburgh Railways to overcome the barrier of Mount Washington to the development of electric streetcar services to points south. Excavation was started October 6, 1902, and the tunnel was officially opened December 1, 1904. The tunnel was paved around the rails to allow for joint use by bus and trolley traffic in 1973.

The Transit tunnel is located almost in line with the Pittsburgh and Castle Shannon Tunnel, which was at a much higher elevation. That tunnel was originally a coal mine accessed from the top of an incline on the river side. It was later opened at the back and used to  run through to other coal mines in the Saw Mill Run valley. The  Pittsburgh and Castle Shannon Railroad operated passenger service through the tunnel from 1873 until 1892, after which passengers journeyed instead via the new Castle Shannon Incline, while coal trains continued to use the old route through the tunnel. From 1909 the main passenger service became Pittsburgh Railways streetcars running from the Transit Tunnel into the Castle Shannon route at South Hills Junction. Because of the related nature of the two tunnels, an urban legend persists that the Transit Tunnel was originally a coal mine.

Accidents

Two spectacular runaway accidents are associated with the tunnel, which is on a steep gradient averaging over 6 percent, and curves as the north portal is reached.

On December 24, 1917, Knoxville service car 4236 ran away downhill after becoming detached from the wire and derailed and overturned on the curve into Carson Street. The car slid on its side until hitting a telegraph pole which ripped the roof off. Twenty-one people were killed and 80 were injured; the claims from the accident sent Pittsburgh Railways into receivership.

On October 29, 1987, a 1700-series all-electric PCC car began to exceed the tunnel's speed limit as it entered the south portal after departing South Hills Junction. The operator, realizing the car could neither stop nor take the sharp curve from the transitway to the Panhandle Bridge ramp, ordered all the passengers to move to the back, and radioed the PAT central dispatcher to clear Station Square. The car left the rails and took Smithfield Street instead (the trolleys' original route downtown, until 1985), crossing Carson Street, sideswiping a PAT bus and a truck, and knocking out a fire hydrant. Miraculously, the car stayed on its wheels, and finally stopped next to the Pittsburgh History & Landmarks Foundation, the former Pittsburgh and Lake Erie station building at Station Square. Thirty-seven people were injured, four seriously, but there were no fatalities. All three braking systems on the car had failed: the drum, dynamic, and magnetic rail brakes. Most of the 1700 series cars were found to have electrical defects, prompting PAT to retire all of their remaining PCC's that had not been rebuilt as 4000 series cars.  Consequently, PAT was left with a shortage of cars, which contributed to the closure of the Overbrook line in 1993.

See also
 Pittsburgh Railways
 Pittsburgh Light Rail
 South Busway
 Pittsburgh and Castle Shannon Tunnel

References

External links

 - Southern portal
 - Northern portal

Railroad tunnels in Pennsylvania
Tunnels in Pittsburgh
5 ft 2½ in gauge railways in the United States